The PLDT HOME TVolution team is the name of the men's (nicknamed "Power Pinoys") and women's (nicknamed "Power Pinays") volleyball teams sponsored by the Philippine Long Distance Telephone Company specifically formed to represent the Philippines in the 2014 Asian Women's Club Volleyball Championship and the 2014 Asian Men's Club Volleyball Championship.

Rosters

Men

Women

See also
PLDT Home TVolution Power Attackers (Philippine Super Liga team)
PLDT Home Telpad Turbo Boosters (Shakey's V-League team)

References

External links
PLDT HOME TVolution Squad at the 2014 Asian Men's Club Volleyball Championship official  website

Women's volleyball teams in the Philippines
Volleyball clubs established in 2014
2014 establishments in the Philippines
Volleyball clubs disestablished in 2014
2014 disestablishments in the Philippines
Men's volleyball teams in the Philippines